Leptomesosella is a genus of beetle in the family Cerambycidae. Its only species is Leptomesosella uniformis. It was described by Stephan von Breuning in 1939.

It's 12 mm long and 3 mm wide, and its type locality is Pusa, India.

References

Pteropliini
Beetles described in 1939
Taxa named by Stephan von Breuning (entomologist)